The Matumbi Lighthouse is located at the south western tip of Pemba, in Tanzania. The lighthouse is on a small island called Matumbi Makubwa. The lighthouse's construction history is unknown, however, the 31m square stone tower was renovated in 2002 by Salem Construction limited from Zanzibar.

See also 
 List of lighthouses in Tanzania

References

External links 
 Tanzania Ports Authority

Lighthouses in Tanzania
Lighthouses completed in 1904
Pemba Island